Xunyang (formerly written as  until 1964) is a county-level city in the south of Shaanxi province, China, bordering Hubei province to the northeast and southeast. It is under the administration of the prefecture-level city of Ankang.

History 
During the Spring and Autumn period, the area of present-day Xunyang County belonged to the State of Chu.

From 1928 to 1949, the area was directly administered by Shaanxi Province.

Since the establishment of the People's Republic of China in 1949, the county has belonged to Ankang. In 1964, its name was changed from Xunyang County to Xunyang County, due to the uncommon nature of the previous first character.

Geography 

To the county's north lies the Qinling Mountains.

Climate 

Government 
In 2019, the county government earned ¥1.877 billion in fiscal revenue, and spent ¥3.994 billion in fiscal expenditures.

Administrative divisions
As of 2020, Xunyang County is divided into 21 towns.

Demographics 
As of 2019, Xunyang County has a population of 450,122 people, who reside in 149,961 households. The county's dominant ethnicity is Han, but populations of Hui, Manchu, Korean, Tujia, Nakhi, Mongol, Miao, Kam, and Yi people reside within the county.

Economy 
In 2019, Xunyang County reported a gross domestic product (GDP) of ¥18.705 billion, an 8.4% annual increase. The county's per capita GDP rose 8.0% to ¥42,982. 10.6% of the county's GDP came from its primary sector, 52.5% came from its secondary sector, and 36.9% came from its tertiary sector. The county's public sector accounted for 41.9% of its GDP.

Agriculture 
The county's main agricultural products include various grains, oils, tobacco, and vegetables. In 2019, the county had about 1 million heads of poultry, 205 thousand heads of swine, 134 thousand heads of goats, and 67 thousand heads of cattle. The county also has sizable aquaculture and forestry industries.

Industry 
Major industries in Xinyang County include the production of medicine, cement and building materials, hydropower, equipment manufacturing, tobacco, food products, and mining. Xunyang County is home to deposits of mercury, antimony, aluminum, zinc, gold, barite, and slate.

Retail 
In 2019, the county experienced a total of ¥5.757 billion in consumer retail sales.

Transport

Road 
National Highway 316 passes through the county. The , part of the G65 Baotou–Maoming Expressway, passes through the county. Shaanxi Provincial Highway 102 also passes through Xunyang County.

Rail 
14 train stations serve the county, which is home to 128 kilometers of railroad. The Xiangyang–Chongqing railway passes through Xunyang County, as does the Xi'an–Ankang railway.

Notes

External links
 
 
Xunyang County Government Website (2020)

County-level divisions of Shaanxi
Ankang